is a former Japanese football player.

Playing career
Oshiba was born in Kofu on 19 November 1973. After graduating from Kokushikan University, he joined J1 League club Urawa Reds in 1996. He played many matches as forward from first season and became a regular player in 1997. The club was relegated J2 League from 2000. In 2000, the club won the 2ns place and returned to J1 in a year. However he moved to Cerezo Osaka in 2001. He became a regular player and the club won the 2nd place 2001 Emperor's Cup. However the club results in league competition were bad and the club was relegated to J2 from 2002. In 2002 season, his opportunity to play decreased and moved to Kashiwa Reysol in August. However he could hardly play in the match. In 2003, he moved to J2 club Yokohama FC. He retired in July 2003.

Club statistics

References

External links

1973 births
Living people
Kokushikan University alumni
Association football people from Yamanashi Prefecture
Japanese footballers
J1 League players
J2 League players
Urawa Red Diamonds players
Cerezo Osaka players
Kashiwa Reysol players
Yokohama FC players
Association football forwards